The Carolina Casket Company is a historic industrial property at 812 Millis Street in High Point, North Carolina.  The main building on the property is a large three-story L-shaped building, framed in heavy timber and clad in brick.  Its main wing is sixteen bays long, the bays separated by brick pilasters with corbelled caps.  It was built in 1929 by the Carolina Casket Company, which began as the Rankin Coffin and Casket Company in the early 20th century.  The company operated on the premises until about 1940, when it went bankrupt.  The building was thereafter occupied for many years by the Carrick Turning Works, a maker of wooden furniture parts.

The property was listed on the National Register of Historic Places in 2015.

See also
National Register of Historic Places listings in Guilford County, North Carolina

References

Buildings and structures in High Point, North Carolina
Industrial buildings and structures on the National Register of Historic Places in North Carolina
Industrial buildings completed in 1929
National Register of Historic Places in Guilford County, North Carolina